Horse Bluff is a cliff in the U.S. state of Wisconsin.

According to tradition, Horse Bluff was named when a saddled horse was found there but its owner never could be located.

References

Landforms of Sauk County, Wisconsin